This is a list of Belgian football transfers for the 2013 summer transfer window. Only transfers involving a team from the Belgian Pro League are listed.

The summer transfer window will open on 1 July 2013, although some transfers took place prior to that date. Players without a club may join one at any time, either during or in between transfer windows. The transfer window ends on 2 September 2013, although a few completed transfers could still be announced a few days later.

Sorted by date

January 2013

April 2013

May 2013

End of 2012–13 season
After the end of the 2012–13 season, several players will return from loan to another club or will not have their contracts extended. These will be listed here, together with other players for which the date is also not specified.

June 2013

July 2013

August 2013

September 2013

Sorted by team

Anderlecht

In:

Out:

Cercle Brugge

In:

Out:

Charleroi

In:

Out:

Club Brugge

In:

Out:

Genk

In:

Out:

Gent

In:

Out:

Kortrijk

In:

Out:

Lierse

In:

Out:

Lokeren

In:

Out:

Mechelen

In:

Out:

Mons

In:

Out:

OH Leuven

In:

Out:

Oostende

In:

Out:

Standard Liège

In:

Out:

Waasland-Beveren

In:

Out:

Zulte Waregem

In:

Out:

Footnotes

References

Belgian
Transfers Summer
2013 Summer